Félix Unden (15 January 1902 – 7 July 1989) was a Luxembourgian water polo player. He competed in the men's tournament at the 1928 Summer Olympics.

References

1902 births
1989 deaths
Luxembourgian male water polo players
Olympic water polo players of Luxembourg
Water polo players at the 1928 Summer Olympics
Sportspeople from Luxembourg City